Ashley is a village and civil parish in the Test Valley district of Hampshire, England,  west of Winchester. Its nearest town is Stockbridge, which lies 2.6 miles (4.2 km) north-west. At the 2001 census the parish had a population of 72. It is in the civil parish of King's Somborne.  Ashley Castle is in the village.

See also
St Mary's Church, Ashley

References

Villages in Hampshire
Test Valley

nl:Ashley (Hampshire)